John Pownall  (1724–1795) was a British office holder and politician who sat in the House of Commons from 1775 to 1776.

Early life
Pownall was baptised at Lincoln in 1724. He was the second surviving son of William Pownall and his second wife Sarah Burniston, daughter of John Burniston, deputy governor of Bombay. He was educated at Lincoln Grammar School. He married Mary Lillingston, daughter of Bowden Lillingston of Ferriby, Yorkshire.

Administrative career
Pownall became Clerk of the  Board of Trade in 1741 and became solicitor and clerk of reports in 1745. He was joint secretary in 1753 and became secretary in 1758, remaining until May 1776. He was under-secretary of state at the American department from  January 1768 to May 1776. He was also a  naval officer in Jamaica from 1755 to 1771 when he became provost marshal general of the  Leeward Islands. He was for many years Deputy Lieutenant and Justice of the Peace for Lincolnshire.

Political career
In November 1775, Pownall was returned as Member of Parliament for St Germans by Edward Eliot in a by-election on 23 November 1775.  He probably saw a parliamentary seat as a stepping stone to a profitable post, as in 1776 he was appointed Commissioner of Excise and resigned his seat in May.

Later life and legacy
Pownall's post as provost marshal general of the Leeward Islands was also confirmed  for life in 1776. In 1785 he became Commissioner of Customs, instead of Excise.  He retired from all public posts in 1788 except as a magistrate. He was a Fellow of the Society of Antiquaries and published several articles on archaeology.

Pownall  died on 17 July 1795, at Great George Street, Westminster, aged 70. His eldest son Sir George Pownall became a member of the legislative council in Quebec.

Publications

 Account of a Roman Tile discovered at Reculver    Archaeologia, vol. VIII. p. 79 
 Some Sepulchral Antiquities discovered at Lincoln Archaeologia vol. X. p. 345
Admeasurements of the Keeps of Canterbury and Chilham Castles  The Gentleman's Magazine 1794, vol. LX1V. p. 999

References

1724 births
1795 deaths
People educated at Lincoln Grammar School
Members of the Parliament of Great Britain for English constituencies
British MPs 1774–1780
Fellows of the Society of Antiquaries of London